Reedley is a city in Fresno County, California, United States. Its chief economic source is agriculture, particularly fruit and vegetable cultivation and has thus dubbed itself "The World's Fruit Basket". Reedley is situated along the Kings River, downstream from Centerville.

Reedley hosts several cultural festivals, including but not limited to the Reedley Fiesta, and the Electrical Farm Equipment Parade.

Reedley is named for Thomas Law Reed, a Civil War veteran who gave half of his holdings to the township in 1888.

History

In the mid-1800s, American Civil War Union veteran Thomas Law Reed settled in Reedley to grow wheat for Gold Rush miners. His donation of land for a railroad station site established the town as the center of the San Joaquin Valley's booming wheat industry. Southern Pacific Railroad officials commemorated his donation by naming the depot in his honor, which the city itself then adopted.

When gold mining fever began to fade, wheat demand slackened. Water from the Kings River was diverted for crop irrigation, and the region's agriculture diversified to include fruits, including grapes, figs, and peaches.

With the establishment of water and railroad services, farming families of European immigrants were recruited, and the settlement was incorporated in 1913, with Ordinance No. 1 adopting and prescribing the style of a Common Seal on February 25, 1913. That same year, the city's first cement sidewalks, sewer system, and fire department, as well as the first of two steel water towers were constructed. Because of proximity, the Reedley post office provided rural mail delivery to the surrounding region, including Route 2 which covered a section of nearby Tulare County (about 5 miles west of Dinuba).

A colony of German American Mennonites, who travelled to California to escape the ecological disaster of the Dust Bowl played an important role in the town's early history, settling in Township 8, an area now known as Navelencia. Reedley contains a community of 25 different Christian churches, including Anglican, Catholic, Armenian, Baptist, and Mennonite congregations. The town is also home to a Buddhist temple. The city's cultural influences include Filipino, Finnish, Lebanese and Japanese immigrants. Since the 1940s, Reedley has seen a large increase in its Hispanic and Latino immigrant population, who have come to represent the majority of Reedley's ethnic makeup.

In 1988, Reedley celebrated the first 100 years since the construction of its Southern Pacific depot, and the 75th anniversary of incorporation. In 2013, the city celebrated its centennial.

Geography

City Buildings and Services

Reedley National Bank

The Reedley National Bank building was built in 1907, when the city was first connected to electricity. The bank has since ceased operation. The building is situated on 1100 G Street.

Mid Valley Times
Reedley's downtown is the home of the local newspaper the Mid Valley Times, formerly known as the Reedley Exponent. The Exponent merged with the Sanger Herald and the Dinuba Sentinel in July, 2019 in order to improve circulation.

Jansen Opera House

The building that houses the Opera House was built in 1903, after a fire destroyed two blocks of downtown Reedley. Danish grain merchant, Jesse Jansen, rallied the downtown shopkeepers to rebuild Reedley's downtown out of brick. The Opera House itself was built at Jansen's personal expense to serve as a cultural and community center. In 1913, the population of Reedley met at the Opera House to vote for incorporation. After the early 1920s, movie houses replaced the popularity of theatre, and the building went into disuse until restoration in 1986. The City of Reedley acquired the building in 2002 by donation.

In 2003, the River City Theatre Company was founded by Mark Norwood, who served as artistic director until his retirement in 2016. The River City Theatre Company currently leases the Opera House and produces musicals and stage plays.

Reedley Municipal Airport
North of the city and southwest of Mount Campbell, Reedley Municipal Airport  is a public airport, serving southeast Fresno County and northwest Tulare County. There are 21 single-engine aircraft based at Reedley Municipal Airport, and during the 12-month period ending on 30 January 2020, the airport logged 33,000 operations.

City administration and policing

Government
Reedley has a Council-City Manager form of municipal government, located at 845 G Street.

Police
The Reedley Police Department is headquartered at 843 G Street, sharing a building with the city government.

The small communities and area surrounding Reedley are served by the Fresno County Sheriff's Office.

Education
Kings Canyon Unified School District is a public school system headquartered in Reedley, but also has schools located in the nearby city of Orange Cove, the towns of Dunlap, Miramonte, and the mountain communities. Reedley also offers private educational institutions such as St. La Salle School (Roman Catholic Private K-8) and Immanuel Schools (Mennonite Private K-12). The local community college, Reedley College, offers undergraduate higher education up to an associate degree as well as various certification courses.

Educational institutions in Reedley:

Elementary
Alta Elementary School
Jefferson Elementary School
Great Western Elementary School
Washington Elementary School
Lincoln Elementary School
Immanuel Elementary School

K-8 schools
Thomas Law Reed K-8 School
Riverview K-8 School
Silas Bartsch K-8 School
St. La Salle Catholic School

Middle schools
General Grant Middle School
Navelencia Middle School
Immanuel Junior High School

High schools
Reedley High School
Immanuel High School
Reedley Middle College High School

Alternative education
Kings Canyon High School
Mountain View Independent School

Community college
Reedley College

Demographics

2010
The population density was  people per square mile (/km). The racial makeup of Reedley was  White, 169 African American, 267 Native American, 797 Asian, 8 Pacific Islander,  from other races, and 998 from two or more races. Hispanic or Latino of any race were  persons.

The census reported that  people ( of the population) lived in households, 119 lived in non-institutionalized group quarters, and 130 were institutionalized.

There were  households, out of which  had children under the age of 18 living in them,  were opposite-sex married couples living together, 946 had a female householder with no husband present, 521 had a male householder with no wife present.  There were 440 unmarried opposite-sex partnerships, and 39 same-sex married couples or partnerships. 886 households were one person and 471 had someone living alone who was 65 or older. The average household size was 3.65.  There were  families ( of all households); the average family size was 3.94.

The age distribution was  people under the age of 18,  people aged 18 to 24,  people aged 25 to 44,  people aged 45 to 64, and  people who were 65 or older.  The median age was 29.1 years. For every 100 females, there were 104.0 males.  For every 100 females age 18 and over, there were 102.7 males.

The homeowner vacancy rate was 1.8%; the rental vacancy rate was 3.7%.   people ( of the population) lived in owner-occupied housing units and  people lived in rental housing units.

2000
At the 2000 census there were  people,  households, and  families in the city. The population density was  people per square mile (/km). The racial makeup of the city was 51.76% White, 1.73% Black or African American, 1.21% Native American, 8.83% Asian, 37.72% from other races, and 4.44% from two or more races.  57.59% of the population were Hispanic or Latino of any race.
There were  households, 46.8% had children under the age of 18 living with them, 61.5% were married couples living together, 12.9% had a female householder with no husband present, and 19.4% were non-families. 15.8% of households were one person and 8.5% were one person aged 65 or older.  The average household size was 3.53 and the average family size was 3.87.

The age distribution was 32.1% under the age of 18, 12.2% from 18 to 24, 29.1% from 25 to 44, 15.2% from 45 to 64, and 11.3% 65 or older.  The median age was 29 years. For every 100 females, there were 105.8 males.  For every 100 females age 18 and over, there were 104.6 males.

Males had a median income of $ versus $ for females. The per capita income for the city was $. About 18.5% of families and 21.4% of the population were below the poverty line, including 31.6% of those under age 18 and 10.4% of those age 65 or over.

Notable people
Charles B. Garrigus, Poet Laureate and state legislator; former professor at Reedley College and Reedley resident
Kris Holmes, type designer and president of Bigelow & Holmes Inc.
Lacy Barnes Mileham, Atlanta 1996 Olympics athlete in discus; psychology professor at Reedley College
Ed Kezirian, UCLA football coach, attended and coached at Reedley College
Ernestine Gilbreth Carey, author of Cheaper By the Dozen, lived in Reedley
Paul Hurst, actor, appeared in Gone With the Wind
Vic Lombardi, Major League Baseball player who pitched for the Pirates and Dodgers; born in Reedley
Rick Besoyan, singer, actor, playwright, composer, and director of musicals such as Little Mary Sunshine
Silas Bartsch, former administrator and interim president of Fresno Pacific University, a K-8 public school in southeast Reedley is named in his honor.

References

External links
 
 ReedleyAirport.com Reedley Municipal Airport
 KingsCanyonUnified.com School District Homepage
 SierraKingsHospital.org Local Hospital

Cities in Fresno County, California
Incorporated cities and towns in California
Populated places established in 1913
1913 establishments in California